Thungapuram (Tunkapuram or Kulōttuŋkacōļapuram or Ciṛu Maturai) is a panchayat village of Perambalur district, Tamil Nadu, India. It was formerly in Tiruchirappalli district

Politics
Before in 1995 Thungapuram have under Perambalur taluk and Tiruchirappalli district. After Composite Perambalur District came into existence after trifurcation of Tiruchirappalli district with effect from 30.09.1995 as per G.O MS.No 913  Revenue / Y3  dated 30.09.1995. Now its comes to under kunnam taluk in Perambalur district.

Thungapuram assembly constituency is part of Chidambaram (Lok Sabha constituency).

Media and communication
Leading Tamil, English languages newspapers are available in Thungapuram. English dailies such as, The New Indian Express, The Hindu
 are available.

External links 
Ariyalur District Official WebSite
Perambalur District Official WebSite
Trichy District Official WebSite

References

Villages in Perambalur district